Cover Me is a Canadian television miniseries which aired on CBC Television in 1999. It starred Colin Ferguson, Caroline Neron, Jackie Burroughs and Philip Craig.

Premise
Quebecois CSIS agent Pascale Laurier is given a special undercover assignment with RCMP Corporal Andrew Chase.

Cast
 Colin Ferguson as Andrew Chase
 Caroline Neron as Pascale Laurier
 Jackie Burroughs as Caitlin Crawford
 Philip Craig as Gareth Endicott
 Neville Edwards as Malloy

References

External links
 
 Cover Me at History of Canadian Broadcasting

CBC Television original programming
1990s Canadian television miniseries